Jack Nicholas Cowgill (born 8 January 1997) is an English footballer who plays as a defender for Boston United.

Club career
Cowgill began his career with Barnsley. He progressed through the club's academy and signed a professional contract in August 2014. He made his Football League debut on 13 December 2014 in a 3–1 defeat against Walsall.

References

External links

1997 births
Living people
Footballers from Wakefield
English footballers
Barnsley F.C. players
Braintree Town F.C. players
AFC Fylde players
English Football League players
Boston United F.C. players
Association football defenders